Lord James Cavendish FRS (bef. 1707 – 14 December 1751) of Staveley Hall, Derbyshire was a British  Whig politician who sat in the English House of Commons between 1701 and 1707 and in the  British House of Commons between 1707 and 1742. He was also a member of the Cavendish family.

Early life
Cavendish was the third son of William Cavendish, 1st Duke of Devonshire of Chatsworth House, member of the House of Cavendish, and his wife Lady Mary Butler, daughter of James Butler, 1st Duke of Ormonde of Kilkenny Castle, member of the Butler Dynasty. At the death of his father, his brother inherited the Dukedom, becoming the 2nd Duke of Devonshire, and was married to Rachel Russell, Lady of the Bedchamber of Queen Anne and granddaughter of the 1st Duke of Bedford of Woburn Abbey. He travelled abroad in France and Italy from 1696 to 1698 and attended Padua University in  1697, in the region of Venetia.

Career
Cavendish was returned as Member of Parliament for Derby in both the general elections of 1701. He did not stand in 1702, but was elected in a contest at the 1705 English general election, defeating the sitting Tories. He voted for the Court candidate in the contest for Speaker on 25 October 1705 and supported the Court on the regency bill proceedings on 18 February 1706. He was returned unopposed for Derby at the 1708 general election. He acted as a teller on the petition of  defeated Whig candidates at Coventry and later voted for the naturalization bill in 1709 and for the impeachment of Dr Sacheverell in 1710. At the 1710 British general election, he was defeated in a contest for Derby and decided not to stand in 1713.

Cavendish was returned as MP for Derby at the 1715 general election  and voted for the septennial bill in 1716 and the repeal of the Occasional Conformity and Schism Acts in 1719. He was returned unopposed at the 1722 and 1727 general elections.  In the latter parliament he took an independent line, and voted against the Government on the Hessians 1730, the army 1732, and the repeal of the Septennial Act 1734, but with them on the civil list 1729, and the Excise Bill 1733. He was elected in a contest at Derby in 1734 and voted for the place bill 1740. He was returned unopposed at the 1741 general election, but on 8 March 1742 he vacated his seat to take up the post of  Auditor of Foreign Accounts or Imposts in Ireland. He did not stand again for Derby at the ensuing by-election.

Death and legacy

Cavendish married with £8,000 Anne Yale (died 1734), daughter of Governor Elihu Yale on 6 July 1708. They had two children:
 William Cavendish (died July 1751) who married Barbara Chandler, daughter of the Prince-Bishop of Durham, Edward Chandler of Durham Castle. They had no children, and his widow married secondly John Fitzwilliam, son of Richard Fitzwilliam, 5th Viscount Fitzwilliam and brother-in-law of Henry Herbert, 9th Earl of Pembroke
 Elizabeth Cavendish, married Richard Chandler in February 1722, one of the two sons of Edward Chandler

As his only son predeceased him by a few months, his heir was his son-in-law Richard Chandler, who subsequently adopted the name of Cavendish.

References

Leo van de Pas genealogies

1751 deaths
British MPs 1707–1708
British MPs 1708–1710
British MPs 1715–1722
British MPs 1722–1727
British MPs 1727–1734
British MPs 1734–1741
British MPs 1741–1747
Fellows of the Royal Society
Members of the Parliament of Great Britain for Derby
Younger sons of dukes
James Cavendish, Lord
Year of birth uncertain
English MPs 1701–1702
English MPs 1705–1707
English MPs 1701
Members of the Parliament of England for Derby
Freemasons of the Premier Grand Lodge of England